Juan Ramón Lucas (born November 2, 1958, in Madrid, Spain) is a Spanish TV presenter for Spanish Television.

Biography 
He began his career in 1979 working in Madrid in Radio Juventude Spanish for 'Youth Radio' and the Diario Informaciones.

His first contacts with television occurred in 1982, when he joined Spanish Television, to work in the program Informe Semanal, Spanish for 'Weekly Report'. Now he is back with an entrepreneurship reality television show called Codigo Emprende.

Education 
BA in journalism from the Complutense University of Madrid.

Awards 
 In 2004 he won the 'TV Academy Award' for 'Best Communicator in TV Entertainment Programs' for All Madrid.
 In 2008 the City council Noren Spaniard named him Knight of the Order of Sabadiego.
 In 2008 he received by the Federation of Radio and Television the Golden Mike for his work on the radio.
 In 2011 he received the Golden Antenna Award in the category of Radio. He also won the Ondas Award for his long and worthy professional career.

References

External links

http://www.formulatv.com/personas/juan-ramon-lucas/

1958 births
Living people
Spanish journalists